Small & Frye is an American television sitcom that was produced by The Walt Disney Company and broadcast on CBS in 1983. This series, which starred Darren McGavin and Jack Blessing as the title characters, lasted for only one season of six episodes.

Synopsis
Nick Small (McGavin) and Chip Frye (Blessing) are private investigators. Due to a lab accident, Frye is able to physically shrink to a height of six inches, but he can't control this ability; he could become miniature or normal size at any time. This is sometimes an aid to their investigations, and sometimes an embarrassing hindrance.

Cast
Darren McGavin as Nick Small
Jack Blessing as Chip Frye 
Debbie Zipp as Phoebe Small
Bill Daily as Dr. Hanratty

US TV Ratings

Episodes
The pilot episode of this series was broadcast as the fourth in order.

References

 

1980s American sitcoms
1983 American television series debuts
1983 American television series endings
CBS original programming
English-language television shows
American fantasy television series
Television series by Disney
American detective television series